Niko Testen (born 1 April 1997) is a Slovenian slalom canoeist who has competed at the international level since 2012.

He won a bronze medal in the K1 team event at the 2021 World Championships in Bratislava.

References

External links

Living people
Slovenian male canoeists
1997 births
Medalists at the ICF Canoe Slalom World Championships